Noel Peter McLoughlin (15 September 1929 – 19 December 2017) is an Australian ice hockey player. He competed in the men's tournament at the 1960 Winter Olympics.

References

External links

1929 births
2017 deaths
Australian ice hockey goaltenders
Ice hockey players at the 1960 Winter Olympics
Olympic ice hockey players of Australia
Sportspeople from Melbourne